Lois Jovanovic ( born May 2, 1947 in Minneapolis - died, September 18, 2018 Santa Barbara, California) was the chief executive officer of the Diabetes Research Institute at the Sansum Clinic in Santa Barbara, California. She pioneered in medical practice that helped many diabetic women give birth to healthier babies.

Early life and career
She was born Lois Gretchen Blaustone to pharmacist parents, Arnold Blaustone and Alice Dechter. A type 1 diabetic, Jovanovic was one of the creators of the Pocket Doc insulin dosage calculator. Jovanovic developed a program that monitored blood glucose which then helped maintain normal blood glucose concentrations throughout a woman's pregnancy. The said protocols for intensive insulin delivery later became the standard for strict glucose control during pregnancy.

References

1947 births
2018 deaths
People with type 1 diabetes
American Jews

American medical researchers